Pantherophis vulpinus, commonly known as the eastern foxsnake or eastern fox snake, is a species of rat snake in the family Colubridae. The species is nonvenomous and is endemic to the eastern Great Lakes region of the United States, as well as adjacent western Ontario in Canada.
Pantherophis gloydi is sometimes considered a distinct species and sometimes considered a junior synonym of the species Pantherophis vulpinus.

Etymology
The specific name, gloydi, is in honor of American herpetologist Howard K. Gloyd.

Speciation
Between about 1990 and 2011, foxsnakes were sometimes divided into two species, with P. gloydi as the eastern foxsnake and P. vulpinus as the western foxsnake. A 2011 paper by Crother, White, Savage, Eckstut, Graham and Gardner proposed instead that the Mississippi River be established as the species boundary between two species of foxsnakes, and that those found to its east be considered P. vulpinus (including those previously known as P. gloydi) and those found to its west be given the new name P. ramspotti.

Habitat
P. vulpinus is found in marshes and other wetlands, as well as in adjacent fields and meadows.

Geographic range
P. v. gloydi is found in the eastern Great Lakes region. Both P. v. gloydi and P. v. vulpinus live in the state of Michigan. P. v. vulpinus lives in the Upper Peninsula of Michigan, where it is sometimes known as the pine snake, and P. v. gloydi lives in the Lower Peninsula of Michigan. P. v. gloydi can also be found in Ohio in the United States, and in Western Ontario in Canada.

Status
P. vulpinus is considered threatened over most of its range due to habitat loss. Numbers have plummeted because of the development of wetlands and coastal habitat. Its numbers have also fallen due to collection for the pet trade. P. vulpinus is often misidentified as the copperhead, Agkistrodon contortrix or as the massasauga, Sistrurus catenatus. P. vulpinus often rattles its tail similar to rattlesnakes as a form of mimicry. This behavior also contributes to its decline in numbers, as many people fear that the snake may be venomous. In Ohio, P. gloydi is listed as a "Species of Concern" by the Ohio Division of Wildlife. In Michigan it is listed as a "Threatened Species" by the DNR and is protected by state law. In Ontario the species is listed as "Threatened Provincially and Nationally".

Diet and behavior
A powerful constrictor, P. vulpinus will consume a variety of small mammals and birds. It has been hypothesized that it will also consume amphibians, but this has not been well documented. P. vulpinus will occasionally wiggle its tail, rustling leaves, to ward off potential predators. This is a form of mimicry. The sound resembles that of a rattlesnake. When threatened, it also may coil and, if it continues to feel threatened, strike.

Reproduction
Like all reptiles, P. vulpinus reproduces sexually and is an r-strategists according to r/K selection theory. An adult female may lay between 7 and 29 eggs, which generally hatch after about 60 days. Eggs are usually laid under logs, or in rotting wood or humus.

Taxonomy

Conservation
Education may be the best form of conservation for P. vulpinus. Being able to differentiate between this species and venomous ones, such as the copperhead or the massasauga, may greatly reduce misidentification cases and subsequent deaths of the snake.

See also
Pantherophis ramspotti – the western fox snake (split from P. vulpinus in 2011)

References

External links
Eastern Fox Snake (Elaphe vulpina gloydi ), Michigan Department of Natural Resources
https://ssarherps.org/wp-content/uploads/2017/10/8th-Ed-2017-Scientific-and-Standard-English-Names.pdf==Further reading==
Conant R (1940). "A New Subspecies of the Fox Snake, Elaphe vulpina Baird & Girard". Herpetologica 2 (1): 1-14. (Elaphe vulpina gloydi, new subspecies).
Conant R (1975). A Field Guide to Reptiles and Amphibians of Eastern and Central North America, Second Edition. Boston: Houghton Mifflin. xviii + 429 pp. + Plates 1-48.  (hardcover),  (paperback). (Elaphe vulpina gloydi, p. 193 + Map 148).
Schmidt, Karl P.; Davis, D. Dwight (1941). Field Book of Snakes of the United States and Canada. New York: G.P. Putnam's Sons. (Elaphe vulpina gloydi, p. 153).
Smith, Hobart M.; Brodie, Edmund D., Jr. (1982). Reptiles of North America: A Guide to Field Identification. New York: Golden Press. 240 pp.  (paperback),  (hardcover). (Elaphe vulpina gloydi, pp. 186-187).
Wright, Albert Hazen; Wright, Anna Allen (1957). Handbook of Snakes of the United States and Canada. Ithaca and London: Comstock Publishing Associates, a division of Cornell University Press. 1,105 pp. (in 2 volumes). (Elaphe vulpina gloydi, pp. 265–269, Figure 82 + Map 23 on p. 223).

Reptiles of the United States
Reptiles of Canada
Colubrids
Reptiles of Ontario
Reptiles described in 1940
Taxobox binomials not recognized by IUCN